"Moonlight Feels Right" is the debut single recorded by the American band Starbuck. Written and produced by Bruce Blackman, the song was released in December 1975 but did not chart until April 1976.

Background
On the American Top 40 radio program of August 14, 1976, Casey Kasem reported the group's difficulties in promoting their single.  Over the winter they had hand-delivered the record to 400 radio stations, 95 percent of which had told them they would play it, but did not.  One of those stations, WERC in Birmingham, Alabama, told them that it sounded like a spring song to them, so they would play it but would wait until spring to do so.  Discouraged, the group re-entered the recording studio.  However, WERC kept their promise and became the first to do so, because "Moonlight Feels Right" became a hit immediately following its first airing.  The song debuted on the U.S. charts the week ending April 17, 1976, with a chart run of over five months.

Blackman detailed the story of the song in his 2018 book, The Road to Moonlight Feels Right - the story behind one of the most popular songs of the '70s.<ref>{{cite web |url=http://www.bruceblackman.com/ |title=The Road to Moonlight Feels Right|website=bruceblackman.com}}</ref>

Marimba solo
The song features a prominent marimba solo by co-founding band member Bo Wagner, who in the early 1970s worked as a studio musician in Los Angeles, appeared on The Lawrence Welk Show for three years and toured with The 5th Dimension, Roger Williams and Liberace. Wagner claimed the performance that ended up on the record was his first attempt, really just a rehearsal. But everyone seems to have realized they wouldn’t get it any better. Wagner went on to set up a performing arts school and taught music and dance. He then shifted careers into health care for the entertainment industry, where he established himself over the course of thirty years as “Dr Bo”. At a 2013 revival performance in Chastain Park, Atlanta he used an electronic instrument (a MalletKAT Pro). Wagner died on June 20, 2017 in Santa Monica, California, aged 72.

Television performances
Starbuck performed "Moonlight Feels Right" on The Midnight Special television program on July 23, 1976 (season 4, episode 37).  The show was hosted by The Spinners.  They also performed it on American Bandstand with Dick Clark on August 28, 1976.

Chart performance
"Moonlight Feels Right" was a major American hit, reaching number three on the Billboard Hot 100, number two on the Cash Box chart, and number four on Record World''. It is ranked as the 34th biggest US hit of the year.  On the Canadian chart, the song peaked at number three in early August 1976.  It is ranked as the 51st biggest Canadian hit of 1976.

Weekly charts

Year-end charts

References

External links
 Lyrics of this song
 

1975 songs
1976 debut singles
Starbuck (band) songs
American soft rock songs
Private Stock Records singles